Barbara Barrie (born Barbara Ann Berman; May 23, 1931) is an American actress and author.

Her film breakthrough came in 1964 with her performance as Julie in the landmark film One Potato, Two Potato, for which she won the Best Actress Award at the Cannes Film Festival. She is best known for her role as Evelyn Stohler in Breaking Away, which brought her an Academy Award nomination for Best Supporting Actress in 1979 and an Emmy Award nomination in 1981 when she reprised the role in the television series based on the film.

On television, Barrie is perhaps best known for her portrayal of the wife of the namesake captain in the detective sitcom Barney Miller between 1975 and 1978. She also is known for her extensive work in the theatre, receiving a Tony Award nomination for Best Featured Actress in a Musical in 1971 for originating the role of Sarah in Stephen Sondheim's Company.

Theatre 
One of Barrie's first professional stage jobs was a resident actress for one season for a theatre company in Corning, New York, where she played the lead in The Moon is Blue in 1953. She also worked at the Rochester Arena Theatre. She made her Broadway debut in the 1955 play The Wooden Dish with Louis Calhern. In 1959, she appeared on Broadway in The Beaux' Stratagem by George Farquhar as Cherry. Some of her earliest Off-Broadway credits were in a 1958 production of The Crucible as Elizabeth Proctor and as Illse in a play version of Mädchen in Uniform directed by Walt Witcover. She was a repertory member of the American Shakespeare Theatre in Stratford for the 1958 and 1959 seasons, playing numerous Shakespearean roles to critical acclaim. In 1961 she went on tour in Europe as Annie Sullivan in The Miracle Worker.

In 1969, she played Viola in Twelfth Night, directed by Joseph Papp at the Delacorte Theater. In 1970, Barrie originated the role of Sarah in Stephen Sondheim's musical Company, in a cast that included Elaine Stritch and Susan Browning. Company won the Tony Award for Best Musical and Barrie was nominated for Best Featured Actress in a Musical.

In 1974, Barrie earned critical acclaim for her Off-Broadway performance as Sparky in The Killdeer by Jay Broad, for which she received an Obie Award for Best Actress and a Drama Desk Award for Most Outstanding Performance. In 1976, Barrie performed in Neil Simon's successful Broadway play California Suite. Barrie played the female lead in the 1979 US premiere of Botho Strauß' 1978 play Big and Little at the Phoenix Theatre in the East Village, Manhattan.

In 1995, Barrie performed in After-Play, written by Anne Meara at the Manhattan Theatre Club. In 2004, Barrie was announced to play Yente in David Leveaux's Broadway revival of Fiddler on the Roof, and played the role during previews, but she departed over "creative differences" and was replaced by Nancy Opel. In 2014, Barrie performed in I Remember Mama Off-Broadway, receiving an Outer Critics Circle nomination for Best Featured Actress in a Play.

She appeared in the Joshua Harmon play Significant Other at the Booth Theatre on Broadway in 2017. She had appeared in the play's premiere in the Roundabout Theatre Company's Off-Broadway production in 2015.

Film
Barrie made her film debut uncredited in Giant (1956). Her first credited role was as Edna in The Caretakers in 1963. The following year, Barrie received her first leading role in film with One Potato, Two Potato, portraying Julie Cullen Richards, a divorced woman newly remarried to an African-American man while her ex-husband demands custody rights for their child, on grounds that their child is in danger because they are living with a man of color. The film was considered controversial when released, dealing with racial tensions at the time, and was nominated for the Academy Award for Best Screenplay. She won the Cannes Best Actress Award for her performance.

In 1979, Barrie received critical acclaim for her role as Evelyn Stohler, the small-town mother of a young man who dreams of becoming an Italian bicycle racer in Breaking Away. Breaking Away was nominated for the Academy Award for Best Picture and Barrie was nominated for the Academy Award for Best Supporting Actress. In 1980, she played the mother of Goldie Hawn's character in Private Benjamin. In the 1999 film, Judy Berlin, Barrie was nominated for an Indie Spirit Award for her performance as Sue Berlin, the mother of Edie Falco's character.

Television
Barrie made her television debut in 1955 performing on Kraft Television Theatre. In 1956, she performed in Horton Foote's teleplay Flight as the sister of Kim Stanley's character. She guest-starred on two episodes of Decoy (1958–59). In 1962, she guest-starred on three episodes of Naked City. In 1963 she played Virginia in a teleplay version of The Dark Labyrinth by Lawrence Durrell. During the 1960s, Barrie guest-starred on many of the popular television series of the time. She appeared in three episodes of The Defenders and two episodes of Ben Casey. in 1962 she did an episode of Route 66 where she played a blind instructor (entitled "Even the stones have eyes"), and in 1963 appeared in episode "The Miniature" of The Twilight Zone, playing opposite the young Robert Duvall.

In 1964, Barrie appeared in two episodes of The Alfred Hitchcock Hour. The first episode was "Isabel", in which Barrie performed the title role of Isabel Smith, the murder target of her husband Howard, played by Bradford Dillman.  The second, titled "Consider Her Ways," also starred Barrie as the lead character, Jane Waterleigh. In 1965 Barrie guest starred as Aimee Rennick in The Fugitive. The episode, entitled "The End Is But The Beginning" is widely considered among fans to be one of the best of the 120 episodes. In 1967 she guest-starred in the TV series The Invaders in the episode "The Enemy". In 1975 Barrie was directed by Lee Grant in the television film For The Use Of The Hall as "Charlotte". In 1977 she appeared in two television films, as the mother of Lesley Ann Warren's character in 79 Park Avenue and as Emily McPhail in Tell Me My Name. In 1978 she played Emily Armsworth in the Disney television film Child of Glass, based on the novel The Ghost Belonged to Me by Richard Peck. In 1978 she played Mrs. Berg in the television film Summer of My German Soldier.

From 1975 to 1978, Barrie was credited in 37 episodes of Barney Miller starring Hal Linden, as Barney's wife Elizabeth. In the 1979 television mini-series Backstairs at the White House she portrayed Mamie Eisenhower. In the fall of 1980 a television series based on the film Breaking Away debuted on ABC with Barrie reprising her role as Evelyn Stoller. The show lasted only part of one season, but Barrie was nominated for an Emmy Award for her performance. Barrie reprised her role as Harriet Benjamin in the 1981 television series Private Benjamin, which was based on the 1980 film of the same name. Also in 1981, Barrie played Ethel Banks in a televised version of the play Barefoot in the Park by Neil Simon and appeared in the television film The Children Nobody Wanted in December of that year.

She guest-starred on a 1987 episode of Family Ties as Aunt Rosemary. For her performance as Mrs. Bream on a February 1992 episode of Law & Order ("Vengeance"), Barrie was nominated for the Emmy Award for Best Supporting Actress in a Drama. In 1994 she played the character of Pauline Robillard in the Emmy-winning mini-series Scarlett. In 1997 she voiced Alcmene, the adoptive mother of Hercules, in the Disney animated film Hercules and in 1998 she played the role of Ruth in the television film A Chance of Snow.

Barrie was credited in 92 episodes of the television series Suddenly Susan as Brooke Shields character's grandmother, Aileen Keane. For her performance in a May 2003 episode of Law & Order: Special Victims Unit ("Perfect") as Paula Haggerty, Barrie was nominated for the Emmy Award for Best Guest Actress in a Drama. In 2004 she appeared in Dead Like Me as Georgia's grandmother / Joy's mother. Her final television credits have included roles on Pushing Daisies, Nurse Jackie, and Enlightened.

Books
Barrie has written two children's books. In 1990, she published Lone Star, a biographical book about a girl named Jane who moves from Illinois to Texas and deals with her Orthodox Jewish family assimilating to Texas culture.

Her second book, Adam ZigZag, was published in 1994 and is also biographical, about a young boy named Adam with an actress mother who struggles with dyslexia.

She is also the author of two books about her battle with colorectal cancer: Second Act (1997) and Don't Die of Embarrassment (1999) and has said that speaking out about early detection is "more important than acting."

Personal life
Barbara Ann Berman was born in Chicago, Illinois.

She graduated from Corpus Christi Senior High School in 1948. She briefly attended Del Mar College as a journalism major, and then transferred to The University of Texas at Austin (UT-Austin), where she graduated with a Bachelor of Fine Arts degree in Drama in 1952. She then moved to New York to begin her professional career.

During her time at UT-Austin, she received two scholarships for drama, including the Kappa Kappa Gamma Donna Dellinger annual scholarship for Most Outstanding Junior in the Drama Department, as well as awards for specific performances, such as the Atlas Award from the Globe Theatre in San Diego for "Best Female Performance for 1950–51" based on her role in the California Theatre's summer production of Much Ado About Nothing as Beatrice.

She married director, actor, and producer Jay Malcolm Harnick (1928–2007) in July 1964. They had two children, Jane Caroline Harnick (born 1965) and Aaron Louis Harnick (born 1969). Jay Harnick founded Theatreworks USA and was the brother of Tony Award-winning musical lyricist Sheldon Harnick.

In 1972, Barrie signed her name to the Ms. campaign: “We Have Had Abortions” which called for an end to "archaic laws" limiting reproductive freedom, they encouraged women to share their stories and take action.

She was treated successfully for rectal cancer in 1994. In September 2014, Barrie announced she has been diagnosed with idiopathic pulmonary fibrosis.

She lives in New York City.

Filmography

Film

Television

References

External links
 
 
 
 
Barbara Barrie papers, 1949–2008, held by the Billy Rose Theatre Division, New York Public Library for the Performing Arts

1931 births
Living people
20th-century American actresses
21st-century American actresses
Actresses from Texas
American film actresses
American musical theatre actresses
American television actresses
American women novelists
American young adult novelists
Cannes Film Festival Award for Best Actress winners
Del Mar College alumni
Jewish American actresses
Jewish American writers
Jewish women writers
People from Corpus Christi, Texas
University of Texas at Austin College of Fine Arts alumni
Novelists from Texas
20th-century American women writers
20th-century American novelists
Women writers of young adult literature
21st-century American Jews